The Hampshire Football Association, also known as Hampshire FA, is the governing body of football in the county of Hampshire, England. It also oversees the Isle of Wight Football Association.

References

External links
 Hampshire FA's official site
 Hampshire FA's Facebook Page
 Hampshire FA Twitter

County football associations
Football in Hampshire
Sports organizations established in 1887